Fair play or Fairplay usually refers to sportsmanship.

Fair play or Fairplay may also refer to:

Arts and entertainment
 Fair Play (1925 film), an American silent film
 Fair Play, a 1972 TV movie starring Paul Ford
 Fair Play (2014 film), a Czech drama
 Fairplay (magazine), a shipping news publication
 Fair Play (novel) (Rent spel), by Finnish author Tove Jansson
 Fair Play, a 2021 play by Ella Road

Sports
 Fair and unfair play, in cricket
 Fairplay Index, a ranking system in rugby
 FIFA Fair Play campaign, a program to increase sportsmanship in association football
 FIFA Fair Play Trophy (disambiguation), a World Cup association football Finals award given for sportsmanship
 FIFA Fair Play Award, a formal recognition of good sportsmanship in association football in general
 UEFA Fair Play ranking, a ranking system used by the Union of European Football Associations
 UEFA Financial Fair Play Regulations
 Fair Play (horse), an American Hall of Fame Thoroughbred racehorse
 KK Fair Play, a defunct basketball club in Serbia

United States place names
 Fair Play, California
 Fair Play AVA, a wine region
 Fairplay, Colorado
 Fairplay, Kentucky
 Fairplay, Maryland
 Fair Play, Missouri
 Fair Play, New Jersey
 Fairplay, Ohio
 Fairplay, Pennsylvania
 Fair Play, South Carolina
 Fair Play, Texas
 Fair Play, Wisconsin

Other uses
 Fair Play for Cuba Committee, a 1960s United States activist group
 Fair Play Men, 18th century Pennsylvania area squatters
 FairPlay, a digital rights management system from Apple Inc.
 Jonny Fairplay (Jon Dalton, born 1974), participant on the reality TV show Survivor: Pearl Islands
 Chwarae Teg (Welsh for fair play), a charity organisation in Wales
 "Fair Play", the slogan on the costumes of the DC Comics superheroes Mister Terrific
 Operation Fair Play, 1977 coup in Pakistan

See also
 Playfair (disambiguation)